Clarence Alexander "Skip" Scarborough (November 26, 1944 – July 3, 2003) was an American songwriter, best known for romantic ballads.

Biography
Scarborough was born in Baton Rouge, Louisiana.  He lived in Los Angeles most of his life. He died of cancer July 3, 2003 in Los Angeles.

A prolific songwriter, Scarborough wrote songs performed by L.T.D., Anita Baker and Earth, Wind & Fire. He co-wrote "Giving You the Best That I Got", which won a Grammy Award in 1988 for Best R&B Song.

Scarborough was a cousin of fellow songwriter and producer Gary Taylor.

Credits
1970
"Love or Let Me Be Lonely" (Friends of Distinction)
1973
"Love Can Make It Easier" (The Dells, (Friends of Distinction))
"Stand Up and Show the World" (The Dells)
"Can't Hide Love" (Creative Source)
"The World's a Masquerade" (Earth, Wind & Fire)
1976
"Can't Hide Love", (Earth, Wind & Fire, Carmen McRae, Hummingbird, Dionne Warwick, D'Angelo)
"Earth, Wind & Fire" (Earth, Wind & Fire)
"Love Ballad" (LTD)
1977
"Don't Ask My Neighbors" (The Emotions)
"Lovely Day" (Bill Withers)
"Love's Holiday" (Earth, Wind & Fire)
"No One Can Love you More" (Phyllis Hyman)
1978
"Love Changes" (Mother's Finest)
"Love Music" (Earth, Wind & Fire)
"Walking the Line" (The Emotions)
1979
"It's Alright with Me" (Patti LaBelle)
"Love Ballad" (George Benson)
1982
"Love Notes" (Deniece Williams)
1983
"They Say" (Deniece Williams) & (Phillip Bailey)
1988
"Giving You the Best That I Got"  (Anita Baker)
1990
"Don't Ask My Neighbors" (Nancy Wilson)
1992
"Sacrifice of Praise" (Edwin Hawkins)
1995
"Feel the Funk" (IMx)

References

External links

 
 [ Skip Scarborough] at Allmusic
 

African-American songwriters
American funk musicians
American soul musicians
Burials in California
Deaths from cancer in California
Grammy Award winners
Musicians from Baton Rouge, Louisiana
1944 births
2003 deaths
20th-century American musicians
Songwriters from Louisiana
20th-century African-American musicians
21st-century African-American people